Paul Warwick may refer to:
 Paul Warwick (racing driver) (1969–1991), English racing driver
 Paul Warwick (rugby union) (born 1981), Australian rugby union player